Earl Anthony Timberlake Jr. (born November 4, 2000) is an American college basketball player for the Bryant Bulldogs of the America East Conference. He previously played for the Miami Hurricanes and the Memphis Tigers.

Early life and high school career
Timberlake grew up in Southeast Washington, D.C. and began playing basketball in fourth grade. As a high school freshman, he played for Rock Creek Christian Academy in Rosaryville, Maryland. After averaging 8.3 points per game in his first season, he transferred to DeMatha Catholic High School in Hyattsville, Maryland. Timberlake averaged 11.3 points per game as a sophomore. In his senior season, he averaged 16.5 points and 10 rebounds per game, capturing his second Washington Catholic Athletic Conference (WCAC) title. He was a two-time first-team All-WCAC selection. In 2019, Timberlake competed for Team Durant at the Nike Elite Youth Basketball League.

Recruiting
Timberlake was a consensus four-star recruit and the highest ranked player from Maryland in the 2020 class. On November 4, 2019, he committed to playing college basketball for Miami (Florida) over offers from Georgetown, Ohio State, Alabama, Maryland, Providence, Wake Forest, North Carolina, Seton Hall, South Carolina and Pittsburgh. Timberlake became the program's best recruit since Lonnie Walker in the 2017 class.

College career
As a freshman with the Miami Hurricanes, Timberlake was limited to seven games due to ankle and shoulder injuries. He averaged 9.3 points, five rebounds and 2.4 assists per game. For his sophomore season, he transferred to Memphis.

Career statistics

College

|-
| style="text-align:left;"| 2020–21
| style="text-align:left;"| Miami
| 7 || 3 || 27.4 || .449 || .286 || .704 || 5.0 || 2.4 || 1.7 || .6 || 9.3
|-
| style="text-align:left;"| 2021–22
| style="text-align:left;"| Memphis
| 29 || 11 || 17.1 || .468 || .000 || .585 || 3.4 || 1.6 || .5 || .5 || 4.7
|- class="sortbottom"
| style="text-align:center;" colspan="2"| Career
| 36 || 14 || 19.1 || .463 || .182 || .625 || 3.8 || 1.8 || .8 || .5 || 5.6

Personal life
Timberlake is the son of Earl Timberlake Sr. and Taundaleah Nicole Stewart. He has two younger sisters, Christiana and Brooklyn.

References

External links
Memphis Tigers bio
Miami Hurricanes bio

2000 births
Living people
21st-century African-American sportspeople
African-American basketball players
American men's basketball players
Basketball players from Washington, D.C.
DeMatha Catholic High School alumni
Memphis Tigers men's basketball players
Miami Hurricanes men's basketball players
People from Southeast (Washington, D.C.)
Shooting guards